Falkland Islanders (also called Kelpers or Falklanders) derive from various origins. Earliest among these are the numerically small but internationally diverse early 19th century inhabitants of the Falkland Islands, comprising and descended in part from settlers brought by Luis Vernet, and English and American sealers; South American gauchos who settled in the 1840s and 1850s; and since the late 1830s, settlers largely from Britain (especially Scotland and Wales) with a minority from other European countries. There has also been significant recent contributions from Saint Helena and Chile.

Early settlers

Following the abandonment of the archipelago by the Spanish authorities in 1811, the only inhabitants of the islands were people who in their various capacities travelled back and forth, carried out a variety of commercial and shipping activities, sought refuge there, and through various efforts attempted to colonize the islands.  Most numerous by far among them were the English and American sealers who had pursued their industry on the Falklands at least since the 1770s, as pointed out by US Secretary of State Edward Livingston. The average number of English and American sealing vessels operating in the area is estimated between 40 and 50 meaning that several hundred to 1,000 sealers were involved.

The settlement of Port Louis, established by Vernet on the site of the former Spanish settlement of Puerto Soledad, had about 100 inhabitants at its high point. According to that source there were about 100 people in the settlement, comprising:

That population was reduced in 1831–32 by various means unconnected with the British arrival at Port Louis on 2 January 1833.  Luis Vernet and his family left the Falklands, and returned to Buenos Aires in November 1831 following his action involving the use of force against local American sealers, while the United States warship USS Lexington, Commander Silas Duncan arrested 7 residents he deemed responsible for the detention of US sealing vessels, and also transported from the islands a further 33 persons, including families.  In his report on the incident Duncan says:

On 5 January 1833, at the moment when the remaining Argentine military abandoned the islands, 27 of the original Vernet settlers and 2 temporary residents remained in Port Louis. These included 12 gauchos from Argentina and their Capataz (foreman); a Frenchman; 5 Indians from Montevideo, Uruguay; 3 women from mainland South America and their two children.  Other nationalities recorded are Irish, Scottish, German, and North American, making up a tiny population of some 7 different nationalities.

An insight into the state of the local population in March 1833 is provided by Captain Fitzroy who outlines the scene of a land based population that is vastly outnumbered by the many ships that ply their trade around the islands, the whole completely unregulated by any authority whatsoever:

Charles Darwin, who visited the Falklands in 1833 and 1834, was greatly impressed by the expertise of his two gaucho assistants in the exploration of the interior of East Falkland:

According to Lieutenant B.J. Sullivan's survey of the Falklands, corroborated by other sources, in 1838 the then single settlement of Port Louis had a population of 40–45 residents including some gauchos and women from among Luis Vernet's settlers. The population grew to 50 in 1841, and 200 by 1849, boosted by the building of Stanley, the new capital with better port facilities which was inaugurated in 1845. New arrivals included more gauchos from South America and military pensioners, farmers and shepherds from the British Isles. The 1851 Falklands Census recorded 20 men as 'Gaucho' by profession, mostly of 'South American' nationality, with 8 of them having wives and young children.

Richard Clement Moody, the first British Governor of the Falkland Islands, recommended in his Dispatch 13 of 1842:

South American influence
The earliest known Falklands settler was Carmelita Penny (Simon) who had arrived as a slave after 1826. Her sons José Simon, Manuel Coronel Jr. and Richard Penny Jr. were all native Falkland Islanders (born in 1831, 1834 and 1837 respectively), whose fathers had been resident in the islands since before 1833.  Among the prominent early Falkland Islanders of Buenos Ayrean origins were the gaucho Manuel Coronel Sr., Santiago Lopez (Darwin's 'St Jago'), German-born Charles Kussler, Antonina Roxa, and another slave Gregoria Madrid.  Most popular among them was Antonina Roxa whose hard work in several occupations (she was a skillful gaucho, and worked as such at Hope Place – Saladero) made her the owner of a  farm and valuable real estate in Stanley. The South American contribution to the Falklander ethnogenesis is further recorded by Commodore Augusto Lasserre of the Argentine Navy, who traveled extensively around the islands; according to his account there were up to 20 Argentine-born Islanders in 1869, "working either as labourers or foremen in the ranches, because in this kind of work they are better than the majority of the foreigners".

The mainland South American-born Falkland Islanders contributed to shaping the Falklander identity in the 1830s–1850s, and nowadays their legacy is visible in Falklands genealogy, Falklands English vernacular, and Falklands toponymy.

A number of modern Falkland Islanders have some mainland South Americans among their 19th century ancestors, mostly Uruguayan gauchos who settled in the islands in connection with the development of the cattle and sheep farming industry that was to form the backbone of the Falklands economy for rather more than a century, until the offshore fisheries assumed that role in the 1980s.  Eventually, gauchos took part in the colonization of the uninhabited West Falkland in the 1860s and 1870s, although by that time many of them were of European origins (Scottish, Gibraltarian etc.).  There are some two dozen stone or turf-built corrals scattered around Camp – picturesque historical monuments of the 1840s–1870s, the epoch of pioneers who settled and developed the country outside Port Louis and Stanley.

The Falklands English vernacular has a fair amount of borrowed Spanish words (often modified or corrupted); they are particularly numerous, indeed dominant in the local horse-related terminology.  For instance, the Islanders use 'alizan', 'colorao', 'negro', 'blanco', 'gotiao', 'picasso', 'sarco', 'rabincana' etc. for certain horse colours and looks, or 'bosal', 'cabresta', 'bastos', 'cinch', 'conjinilla', 'meletas', 'tientas', 'manares' etc. for various items of horse gear.

Unlike the older English, French and Spanish place names given by mariners, which refer mainly to islands, rocks, bays, coves, and capes (points) important for navigation, the post-1833 Spanish names usually identify inland geographical locations and features, reflecting the new practical necessity for orientation, land delimitation and management in the cattle and sheep farming.  Among the typical such names or descriptive and generic parts of names are 'Rincon Grande', 'Ceritos', 'Campito', 'Cantera', 'Terra Motas', 'Malo River', 'Brasse Mar', 'Dos Lomas', 'Torcida Point', 'Pioja Point', 'Estancia', 'Oroqueta', 'Piedra Sola', 'Laguna Seco', 'Manada', etc.

Late nineteenth to early twentieth century
The development of the sheep-breeding industry in the second half of the 19th century was accompanied by substantial immigration, increasing the population sevenfold in fifty years, from 287 in 1851 to 2,043 in 1901. The vast majority of immigrants during that period came from the British Isles, mostly from Scotland.  Scots were particularly common in Darwin, many of them coming from the Orkney and Shetland Islands, which have a similar climate to these areas.

An additional boost to that population growth came from the expansion of Stanley's port activities in service of the ships sailing between the Atlantic Ocean and the Pacific via the Strait of Magellan or Cape Horn. The port was particularly busy during the California Gold Rush, subsiding following the opening of the Panama Canal in 1914.

The early 20th century brought about a new industry to the region, Antarctic whaling in South Georgia, that supported a transient population varying from few hundred in winter to over 1,000 in summer.  Some Falkland Islanders found employment with South Georgian whaling bases or ships, while some whalers settled in the Falklands to blend into the local populace.  The whalers were predominantly Scandinavian (Norwegians, Swedes and Danes), with a minority of Britons, Germans, and a variety of other European nations.  As a result of both natural demographic growth and ongoing immigration, the population of the Falkland Islands reached a peak of 2,392 recorded in the 1931 census, a figure that would not be surpassed until late in the twentieth century.

Post-Falklands War

Having shrunk as low as 1,813 in 1980, since the Falklands War the number of Falkland Islanders has been steadily increasing to exceed 3,100 in 2007. That new growth was supported by a thriving economy, with wool monoculture giving way to a more diversified agriculture, fisheries and tourism, augmented with services related to the military garrison as well as to the islands' role as one of the major gateways to neighbouring Antarctica.  According to the 2001 census, the people who have settled in the Falklands during the last decade originated from the United Kingdom (30 per cent of the entire population excepting those resident in connection with the military garrison, including however some children born abroad to Falklander parents), Saint Helena and Ascension Island (6 per cent; 15.8 per cent if people resident in connection with the military garrison were included, Chile (3 per cent), Australia and New Zealand (2.3 per cent), Argentina (1 per cent), followed by Russia, Germany, with minor contributions by several dozens other nations from six continents. Children born abroad to Falkland Island women were enumerated in the 2001 census as being "Foreign-born".

Some Falkland Islanders were even born beyond the Antarctic Convergence, most recently in the 1980s in the territory of South Georgia and the South Sandwich Islands.

Evolution of Falkland Islander identity

The Falkland Islanders are British by citizenship, and by either origins or naturalization.  They are one of the nations and mini-nations of the United Kingdom and the British overseas territories, including also the English, Scots, Welsh, Northern Irish, Channel Islanders, Gibraltarians, Saint Helenians, Bermudians, Caymanians etc. Along with their common British identity, each of these has its own distinct identity shaped in the respective particular circumstances of political, economic, social and cultural evolution history.  According to Lewis Clifton, Speaker of the Falklands Legislative Council, the Falkland Islanders are no exception:

Besides geographical isolation, the emerging of a distinct Falkland Islander national identity along with the originally undifferentiated British identity was possibly influenced by the devolution processes taking place among the United Kingdom nations:

Since the 1960s, the political dimension of Falklander identity has evolved around the campaign for recognition of the Islanders' right to self-determination. Key to this was the formation of the Falkland Island Committee in 1968, Britain's recognition of the right to self-determination after the Islanders turned down the so-called "leaseback proposal" put forward by the Foreign and Commonwealth Office in 1980, and the new Falklands Constitution enacted in 1985. The constitution vests political power in the elected Falklands Legislative Council rather than the old style colonial governors.

A specific regional aspect of identity is the human relationship the Islanders traditionally maintain with Chile and Uruguay, and the well-known Islander rejection of the Argentine sovereignty claim:

The Falklands War had tremendous security, economic and social implications for the Falkland Islanders.  The War opened the prospects for long needed reforms, reversing the demographic, economic and social decline that the Falklands had suffered for several decades.  The Islanders became self-confident masters of their natural resources, and managers of a vibrant economy that attracted a wide range of new technical and managerial personnel to immigrate.

The Falkland Islanders consider themselves a nation, the ethnogenesis of which is no different from that of other immigrant nations typical of the Americas, Australia or New Zealand; indeed no different from the case of neighbouring South American nations, as pointed out by Councillor Mike Summers:

See also
 British people
 Falkland Islands English
 History of the Falkland Islands
 Timeline of the history of the Falkland Islands

References

History of the Falkland Islands
Society of the Falkland Islands
Scottish diaspora
Demographics of the Falkland Islands